Ruby Beach is the northernmost of the southern beaches in the coastal section of Olympic National Park in the U.S. state of Washington.

Like virtually all beaches on the northern coast, Ruby Beach has a tremendous amount of driftwood.  It is notable for the number of sea stacks there.

The beach is so called because of the ruby-like crystals in the beach sand.

Destruction Island is located about 4 miles southwest off the beach. The island and the Destruction Island Lighthouse can be seen from the beach.

References

External links

 Visiting Kalaloch and Ruby Beach, from the National Park Service

Beaches of Washington (state)
Protected areas of Jefferson County, Washington
Landforms of Olympic National Park
Landforms of Jefferson County, Washington